New Carlisle is a city in Clark County, Ohio, United States. The population was 5,785 at the 2010 census. It is part of the Springfield, Ohio Metropolitan Statistical Area.

History
New Carlisle was originally called Monroe, and under the latter name was laid out in 1810. The present name is a transfer from Carlisle, Pennsylvania, the birthplace of some of the first settlers. A post office called New Carlisle has been in operation since 1828. New Carlisle was incorporated as a village in 1831.

On June 21, 1933, the infamous John Dillinger committed his first bank robbery, taking $10,000 from the New Carlisle National Bank, which occupied the building which still stands at the southeast corner of Main Street and Jefferson Street (state routes 235 and 571) in New Carlisle.

New Carlisle was incorporated as a city in 1973.

Geography
New Carlisle is located at  (39.940314, −84.029634).

The census-designated place of Park Layne is adjacent to New Carlisle.

Demographics

2010 census
As of the census of 2010, there were 5,785 people, 2,214 households, and 1,489 families living in the city. The racial makeup of the city was 90.1% White, 0.5% African American, 0.1% Native American, 0.4% Asian, 7.6% from other races, and 1.3% from two or more races. Hispanic or Latino of any race were 11.3% of the population.

There were 2,214 households, of which 35.7% had children under the age of 18 living with them, 48.1% were married couples living together, 14.1% had a female householder with no husband present, 5.0% had a male householder with no wife present, and 32.7% were non-families. 27.6% of all households were made up of individuals, and 14% had someone living alone who was 65 years of age or older. The average household size was 2.58 and the average family size was 3.12.

The median age in the city was 36.2 years. 26% of residents were under the age of 18; 9.2% were between the ages of 18 and 24; 25.7% were from 25 to 44; 24.3% were from 45 to 64; and 14.7% were 65 years of age or older. The gender makeup of the city was 47.7% male and 52.3% female.

2000 census
As of the census of 2000, there were 5,735 people, 2,207 households, and 1,551 families living in the city. The population density was 2,968.2 people per square mile (1,147.3/km2). There were 2,286 housing units at an average density of 1,183.1/sq mi (457.3/km2). The racial makeup of the city was 95.40% White, 0.33% African American, 0.26% Native American, 0.35% Asian, 0.02% Pacific Islander, 0.77% from other races, and 0.19% from two or more races. Hispanic or Latino of any race were 2.74% of the population.

There were 2,207 households, out of which 33.6% had children under the age of 18 living with them, 52.7% were married couples living together, 12.7% had a female householder with no husband present, and 29.7% were non-families. 26.8% of all households were made up of individuals, and 13.1% had someone living alone who was 65 years of age or older. The average household size was 2.56 and the average family size was 3.09.

In the city the population was spread out, with 27.1% under the age of 18, 8.4% from 18 to 24, 29.5% from 25 to 44, 20.2% from 45 to 64, and 14.8% who were 65 years of age or older. The median age was 35 years. For every 100 females, there were 89.4 males. For every 100 females age 18 and over, there were 84.6 males.

The median income for a household in the city was $39,081, and the median income for a family was $43,320. Males had a median income of $33,413 versus $21,449 for females. The per capita income for the city was $16,490. About 9.4% of families and 11.5% of the population were below the poverty line, including 17.4% of those under age 18 and 9.0% of those age 65 or over.

Education
New Carlisle is in the Tecumseh Local School District, formerly known as New Carlisle-Bethel Local District prior to fall of 1989. Part of New Carlisle is still annexed to Bethel Local Schools in Miami County.

Notable people

 Patricia Barringer – All-American Girls Professional Baseball League ballplayer.
 General Frederick Funston – Recipient of the Medal of Honor
 Tyler Maynard – Broadway actor
 Spanky McFarland – college baseball coach at Northern Illinois and James Madison
 Roy J. Plunkett – inventor of Teflon
 Jake Crist (aka John Crist) - Professional Wrestler IMPACT Wrestling

References

Cities in Ohio
Cities in Clark County, Ohio
Populated places established in 1810
1810 establishments in Ohio